is a Japanese multinational automotive components manufacturer headquartered in Hamamatsu, Shizuoka, Japan. They specialize in torque converters, catalytic converters, exhaust systems and brake systems. There are five locations in Japan including three plants, one R&D facility and a head office. Affiliates include Sumirex Co., Ltd. and Shinnichi Industries Co., Ltd. Overseas, Yutaka operates 12 facilities in 9 countries.

References

Japanese companies established in 1976
Automotive companies of Japan